John Humphrey House may refer to:

John Humphrey House (Simsbury, Connecticut), listed on the National Register of Historic Places in Hartford County, Connecticut
John Humphrey House (Orland Park, Illinois), listed on the National Register of Historic Places in Cook County, Illinois

See also
Humphrey House (disambiguation)